Diane Jacquin de Margerie (born 24 December 1927) is a French woman of letters and translator from English.

Biography 
Diane de Margerie is the daughter of Jenny Fabre-Luce (1896–1991) and Roland de Margerie (1899–1990). Her father was the nephew of writer Edmond Rostand and the cousin of Gérard Mante, who married Marcel Proust's niece. Her mother was loved by Austrian writer Rilke.

Diane de Margerie is 's sister (1923–2003), a Jesuit and theologian, and Emmanuel de Margerie (1924-1991), ambassador.

She first married Prince Ricardo Pignatelli della Leonessa (1927–1985). A son was born in 1952, Fabrizio Pignatelli della Leonessa. She marries in second marriage the writer Dominique Fernandez; the couple had a son, and a daughter, Laetitia Fernandez.

A novelist, literary critic, short story writer, biographer, translator, de Margerie is the author of a diverse work.

Once a member of the Prix Femina jury, she has received several awards. She lived in China and Italy.

Her work leaves much room for autobiography. In La Femme en pierre (1989), de Margerie celebrates the cathédrale Notre-Dame de Chartres, the city where she lives. With Isola, Retour des îles Galapagos, she recounts, in a poetic style, her impressions of travel.

Work 
1974: Le Détail révélateur, novel, Flammarion, Paris
1976: Le Paravent des enfers, novel, Flammarion
1979: L’Arbre de Jessé, novel, Flammarion
1979: La Volière, récit, Paris
1980: Ailleurs et autrement, short stories, Flammarion
1982: Duplicités, short stories, Flammarion
1985: Le Ressouvenir, Flammarion
1989: La Femme en pierre, Éditions Gallimard, coll. « L'un et l'autre », Paris
1992: Marcel Proust (Marcel et Léonie), Christian Pirot
1994: Le Jardin secret de Marcel Proust, album, photographs by André Martin, Albin Michel, Paris
1996: Dans la spirale, Gallimard, coll. « Haute Enfance », Paris
1997: Bestiaire  insolite du Japon, Albin Michel
1998: Autour de Gustave Moreau, Christian Pirot
2000: Edith Wharton, lecture d'une vie, biography
2001: Maintenant, Mercure de France, Paris
2003: Isola, Retour des îles Galapagos, Paris
2004: Aurore et George, biography, Albin Michel
2006: L’Étranglée, novel, Mercure de France
2007: Noces d'encre, essay, Philippe Rey
2010: Proust et l’obscur, essay, Albin Michel
2012: Passion de l’énigme, Mercure de France
2013: Éclats d’insomnie, Éditions Grasset
2016: De la grenouille au papillon, Arléa
2016: A la recherche de Robert Proust, Flammarion

Prizes and distinctions 
 1985: Prix Marcel Proust for Le Ressouvenir 
 1994: Commandeurs of the Ordre des Arts et des Lettres
 1996: Prix Jacques-Chardonne and prix du Pen club français, for Dans la spirale
 2000: Prix Marcel-Thiébaut, prix France-Amérique, for Edith Warton, lecture d'une vie
 2001: Prix littéraire Prince-Pierre-de-Monaco, for all her work
 2004: Prix Médicis essai for Aurore et George
 2008: Commander of the National Order of Merit (France)
 2009: Prix Contrepoint for La passion Brando
 2013: Prix Cazes for Éclats d'insomnie
 2015: Officier of the Légion d'honneur

References

External links 
 Diane de Margerie on Babelio
 Diane de Margerie quitte le jury du Femina on LivresHebdo (13 November 2014)
 Diane de Margerie on France Culture
 Diane de Margerie on the site of Arléa
 Diane de Margerie raconte sa passion pour l'écriture on YouTube

20th-century French writers
21st-century French writers
20th-century French women writers
21st-century French women writers
French women short story writers
French short story writers
Prix Médicis essai winners
French biographers
20th-century French essayists
21st-century French essayists
1927 births
Officiers of the Légion d'honneur
Commandeurs of the Ordre des Arts et des Lettres
Commanders of the Ordre national du Mérite
English–French translators
Living people
Women biographers